These are the destinations operated by Novair (as of July 2017).

Destinations

External links 
Novair

References 

Lists of airline destinations